Sabanagrande is a municipality in the Honduran department of Francisco Morazán.

People make a living by planting corn and beans and selling them on the market. Many people also sell rosquillas. Cattle is also raised and cheese and other products are sold.

Municipalities of the Francisco Morazán Department